Did you mean the ATP Masters tournament, then see the Miami Masters article

The Miami Open is a defunct men's tennis tournament that was played on the WCT circuit from 1968, 1971–1974 and the Grand Prix tennis circuit from 1977–1978.  The event was played on outdoor hard courts in 1968, 1971–1974, outdoor clay courts in 1977, and indoor carpet courts in 1978.  The event was held in Miami, Florida.

Past finals

Singles

Doubles

References

External links
 ATP results archives

Grand Prix tennis circuit
1968 establishments in Florida
WCT Miami Open
World Championship Tennis
Recurring sporting events established in 1968
Recurring sporting events disestablished in 1978
1978 disestablishments in Florida
Sports competitions in Miami